Intake Two is a small lake created by a dam on Bishop Creek. It is approximately 16 miles west of Bishop, California. It is well known for its fishing as it is annually stocked with Rainbow Trout, and has a healthy population of wild Brown Trout.

See also
Lake Sabrina

References

Data

Rivers of Inyo County, California
Rivers of the Sierra Nevada (United States)
Tributaries of the Owens River
Inyo National Forest
Bishop, California
Owens Valley
Rivers of Northern California
Rivers of the Sierra Nevada in California